Exoedicerotidae is a family of crustaceans belonging to the order Amphipoda.

Genera

Genera:
 Bathyporeiapus Schellenberg, 1931
 Exoediceroides Bousfield, 1983
 Exoediceropsis Schellenberg, 1931

References

Amphipoda